WordZap is a puzzle video game designed by Michael F.C. Crick, son of scientist Francis Crick. In 1991, it was included with Volume 3 of the Microsoft Entertainment Pack and was later released by Jaleco for the Game Boy in 1992. An updated version for newer editions of Microsoft Windows is available on the game's official website as shareware. The game has been compared with Scrabble and Boggle; in WordZap, players race to make words proper English words to fill their rack of words, but when one player makes a word already found by the other player, the word is "zapped" from both players' racks.  Each round ends when either one player fills the word rack, or time runs out without either player being able to make another word.

Gameplay

In the Game Boy version, players can choose between 3, 4, or 5 letter words. They can also enable or disable hints, allow or disallow plural forms of words and even choose the level of vocabulary used in the game. Each round has a different theme attached to it (e.g., "Any Letter"). Players have a limited time to solve each round before it ends. They also have a choice between the conventional "WordZap" mode and the "WordHai" mode; which permits players to create 3-letter words from a set of 21 tiles. Removing a tile from the screen requires using it; opening up options for building new words.

There is a built-in dictionary using a complete list of ten thousand English language words. Two players can compete against other using a Game Link. Only the "WordZap" mode is available for two-player play. All types of skill levels are accommodated in this game from novice players to experts.

References

External links

1991 video games
Game Boy games
Jaleco games
Realtime Associates games
Windows games
Word games
Multiplayer and single-player video games
Video games developed in the United States